In genetics, a reciprocal cross is a breeding experiment designed to test the role of parental sex on a given inheritance pattern.  All parent organisms must be true breeding to properly carry out such an experiment.  In one cross, a male expressing the trait of interest will be crossed with a female not expressing the trait.  In the other, a female expressing the trait of interest will be crossed with a male not expressing the trait.
It is the cross that could be made either way or independent of the sex of the parents.
For example, suppose a biologist wished to identify whether a hypothetical allele Z, a variant of some gene A, is on the male or female sex chromosome. They might first cross a Z-trait female with an A-trait male and observe the offspring. Next, they would cross an A-trait female with a Z-trait male and observe the offspring. Via principles of dominant and recessive alleles, they could then (perhaps after cross-breeding the offspring as well) make an inference as to which sex chromosome contains the gene Z, if either in fact did.

Reciprocal cross in practice

Given that the trait of interest is either autosomal or sex-linked and follows by either complete dominance or incomplete dominance, a reciprocal cross following two generations will determine the mode of inheritance of the trait.

White-eye mutation in Drosophila melanogaster

Sex linkage was first reported by Doncaster and Raynor in 1906 who studied the inheritance of a colour mutation in a moth, Abraxas grossulariata. Thomas Hunt Morgan later showed that a new white-eye mutation in Drosophila melanogaster was also sex-linked.  He found that a white-eyed male crossed with a red-eyed female produced only red-eyed offspring.  However, when they crossed a red-eyed male with a white-eyed female, the male offspring had white eyes while the female offspring had red eyes.  The reason was that the white eye allele is sex-linked (more specifically, on the X chromosome) and recessive.

The analysis can be more easily shown with Punnett squares:

As shown in Table 1, the male offspring are white-eyed and the female offspring are red-eyed.  The female offspring are carrying the mutant white-eye allele X(mut), but do not express it phenotypically because it is recessive.  Although the males carry only one mutant allele like the females, the X-chromosome takes precedence over the Y and the recessive phenotype is shown.

As shown in Table 2, all offspring are Red-eyed.  The males are free of the mutation.  The females however, are carriers.

References

External links
Simple Mendelian Genetics in Drosophila

Classical genetics